Synodontis decorus is a species of upside-down catfish. Common names include clown catfish, clown synodontis, clown syno, clown squeaker, and barredtail squeaker.

Distribution
The Synodontis decorus is native to Cameroon, the Democratic Republic of the Congo and the Republic of the Congo can be found anywhere in the Congo basin except the Luapula River system. This is one of the many interesting Synodontis species found in Malebo Pool.

Description
The unusual trait of this Synodontis is the long extension of the dorsal fin which can reach as far back as its caudal fin and along with its attractive body colouration makes it one of the most popular catfish of the genus, Synodontis. The head and body are compressed. It has three pairs of barbells, maxillary barbells with a small membrane at the base and small slender ramifications larger than on maxillary barbells.It is mostly white with black spots. Its ventral region is white. The dorsal, caudal, anal and ventral fins are white with black transverse bands.

Size, age, and growth
This species grows to a length of  TL.

Parasites
As other fish, Synodontis decorus harbours parasites, including species of the monogenean genus Synodontella.

References

External links 

decorus
Catfish of Africa
Fish of Cameroon
Fish of the Democratic Republic of the Congo
Fish of the Republic of the Congo
Fish described in 1899
Taxa named by George Albert Boulenger